The Seal of the Confederate States was used to authenticate certain documents issued by the federal  government of the Confederate States. The phrase is used both for the physical seal itself (which was kept by the Confederate States Secretary of State), and more generally for the design impressed upon it. On May 20, 1863, C.S. Secretary of State Judah Benjamin instructed James Mason to arrange for its manufacture in London. The seal was first used publicly in 1864.

Design 

The Seal of the Confederate States prominently features the Statue of Washington in the capital square at Richmond. In the seal, Washington is surrounded with a wreath made of some of the main agricultural products of the Confederacy: wheat, corn, tobacco, cotton, rice and sugar cane. The top margin features the words 'The Confederate States of America: 22 February 1862'. This date reflects the establishment of the federal  government under the new Confederate Constitution when Jefferson Davis was inaugurated as the President of the Confederate States on Washington's birthday (February 22), 1862, in the capital square at Richmond, then the Confederacy's capital. The bottom margin contains the national motto, Deo vindice, meaning '(With) God (as) our defender/protector'. C.S. Senator Thomas Semmes, in proposing the motto, took pains to stress that both the provisional and the permanent Confederate constitution "had deviated in the most emphatic manner from the spirit that presided over the construction of the Constitution of the United States, which is silent on the subject of the Deity."

History 

According to the Richmond Whig of September 25, 1862, a design that passed the Senate represented in the foreground a Confederate soldier, in position to charge bayonet; in the middle distance, a woman with a child in front of a church, both with hands uplifted in the attitude of prayer; for a background, a homestead in the plain, with mountains in the distance beneath the meridian sun; the whole surrounded by a wreath composed of the stalks of sugar-cane, the rice, the cotton and the tobacco plants, the margin inscribed with the words 'Seal of the Confederate States of America' above, and 'Our Homes and Constitutions' beneath. This seal was never used.

The final design was approved on April 30, 1863, and a set of embossing dies ordered from the London engraver Joseph Wyon. The seal was first used publicly in 1864. The dies eventually reached Richmond before the end of the war. However, due to the risks of running the Union blockade, the accompanying embossing press was only shipped as far as Bermuda. The dies (crafted in silver) were thus unlikely to ever have been used in any official capacity. Both sets of artifacts initially passed through private ownership before ultimately entering museum collections. The seal is kept at Richmond's American Civil War Museum. The press is in the BNT Museum at the Globe Hotel, St. George's.

Gallery

See also  
 Flag of the Confederate States
 National symbols of the Confederate States

Notes

References

Further reading

External links 

 Seal of the Confederate States at the British Library
 Seal of the Confederate States at the Library of Congress
 Seal of the Confederate States at the National Museum of American History
 Seal of the Confederate States at the University of Georgia

Seal
George Washington in art
National seals
Seal
Symbols introduced in 1863